The 2011−12 UEFA Women's Champions League was the eleventh edition of the European women's championship for football clubs. The final was held in the Olympiastadion in Munich, Germany on 17 May 2012.

As in the past two Champions League seasons, the eight highest ranked nations got two entries to the tournament. The point of entry was changed this season however. In the previous years the national runners-up had to enter the qualification round. With those teams always easing through their groups, with the exception of Umeå in 2010–11, UEFA decided to give those a direct entry to the round of 32. As a result, eight nations which under previous rules would have had direct entry to that round now had to go through the qualifying stage.

Team allocation and distribution

A total of 54 teams from 46 UEFA associations were confirmed to be entering this year's competition by UEFA on 15 June 2011. This is a new record for the Women's Champions league, as Albania and Latvia are represented for the first time, and the winners of the Luxembourg league entered for the first time since 2001–02. In total 11 teams got their European debut.  Countries are allocated places according to their 2010 UEFA league coefficient for women, taking into account performances in women's club competitions between 2005–06 and 2009–10.

Associations ranked 1–8 entered two clubs, the remaining associations entered one team. Unlike the men's Champions League, not every association have entered teams in the past, so the exact number of clubs in each round was only known shortly before the draw.

Teams

 1 As the new English Super League did not start until May 2011, the FA decided to give their spots to the two finalists of the 2010–11 FA Women's Cup.
 CH denotes the national champion, RU the national runner-up, CW the cup-winner, CR losing cup finalist.

Qualifying round

Seeding and draw

The draw was held on 23 June 2011.  32 teams entered in the qualifying round, and were divided into eight groups of four teams, with one team from each seeding pot:

Pot 1
  Rayo Vallecano
  PAOK
  Unia Racibórz
  Lehenda-ShVSM
  NSA Sofia
  1° Dezembro (host)
  Glasgow City
  SFK 2000 Sarajevo (host)

Pot 2
  Krka (host)
  MTK
  Gintra Universitetas
  Apollon Limassol (host)
  Bobruichanka
  KÍ Klaksvík
  PK-35 Vantaa (host)
  YB Frauen

Pot 3
  Spartak Subotica (host)
  ASA Tel Aviv University
  Swansea City
  Slovan Bratislava
  Olimpia Cluj
  Osijek (host)
  Peamount United
  Goliador Chişinău

Pot 4
  Newtownabbey Strikers
  Ataşehir Belediyesi
  Pärnu JK
  ZFK Naše Taksi (host)
  Ada
  Liepājas Metalurgs
  Mosta
  Progrès Niedercorn

The eight hosts were confirmed by UEFA before the draw, and two hosts could not be placed in the same group. Krka, Osijek and Apollon Limassol also hosted tournaments in 2009 and 2010.

Each team plays the other teams in the group once. The matches are to be played between 11 and 16 August 2011.

Tie-breaker criteria

As usual in UEFA competitions, three points are awarded for a win, and one point for a draw. If teams are equal on points after all matches have been played, the following criteria applies:

 Higher number of points obtained in the matches among the teams in question.
 Superior goal difference resulting from the matches among the teams in question.
 Higher number of goals scored in the matches among the teams in question.
 Superior goal difference in all group matches
 Higher number of goals scored in all group matches
 Higher number of club coefficient points
 Drawing of lots

Criteria 1–3 are reapplied until the tie cannot be resolved; only then is criteria 4 used.

Group 1

Group 2

Group 3

Group 4

Group 5

Group 6

Group 7

Group 8

Ranking of group runners-up

The two best runners-up also qualify for the round of 32. The match against the fourth-placed team in the group does not count for the purposes of the runners-up table. The tie-breakers in this ranking are:

 Higher number of points obtained
 Superior goal difference
 Higher number of goals scored
 Higher number of club coefficient points
 Fair play conduct in all group matches

Debutants Peamount and 2004–05 quarter-finalists Bobruichanka qualified for the round of 32 as best runners-up.

Knockout-stage

Bracket
As there were two draws, one for Round of 32 and 16 and another draw for the Quarter-finals to the final, the bracket has been created in retrospect.

Round of 32
Of the 32 teams that will participate in this round, 22 are directly qualified, and the last 10 qualify from the qualification groups above. Eight as group winners, and two as the best runners-up. When determining the best runners-up, matches against the fourth placed team in the group is not taken into account. 16 seeded teams will be drawn against 16 unseeded teams. The title holder is the number 1 seed all other are seeded by their UEFA coefficient. The following teams are qualified for the round of 32.

The round of 32 and round of 16 were drawn on 23 August 2011 at UEFA headquarters. In the round of 32 no teams from the same country could be drawn against each other, same with teams from the same qualifying group. A change made to last year, when Breiðablik UBK and FCF Juvisy met in qualifying and the round of 32. There are no restrictions to the round of 16. Seeded teams play their second leg at home.

First leg

Second leg

Round of 16

Notes
Note 1: Order of legs reversed after original draw.

First leg

Second leg

Quarter-finals
The draw for the quarterfinals was held on 17 November 2011. Matches were played on 14–15 March 2012 and 21–22 March 2012.

First leg

Second leg

Semi-finals

First leg

Second leg

Final

Top goalscorers

Source:

Round and draw dates

UEFA has scheduled the competition as follows.

References

External links
Official website

 
UEFA Women's Champions League seasons
Wom
UEFA
UEFA